Don't Stay may refer to:

 Don't Stay (album), a 2008 album by Nami Tamaki
 "Don't Stay" (Laura Izibor song), from her album Let The Truth Be Told
 "Don't Stay", a song by Linkin Park from Meteora
 "Don't Stay", a song by Joanne from Do Not Disturb